The Minister for Immigration, Citizenship and Multicultural Affairs is a ministerial post of the Australian Government and is currently held by Andrew Giles, pending the swearing in of the full Albanese ministry on 1 June 2022, following the Australian federal election in 2022.

The post was created in 1945 and its inaugural officeholder was Arthur Calwell as the Minister for Immigration. On 20 December 2017, Prime Minister Malcolm Turnbull introduced a new major portfolio responsible for national security: Home Affairs.  The Hon Peter Dutton  retained the duties of Minister for Immigration and Border Protection, with additional responsibilities awarded as the Minister for Home Affairs. Following the appointment of Prime Minister Scott Morrison in August 2018, Morrison re-appointed Peter Dutton to the Home Affairs Ministry,  previously introduced to the 'super-Ministry' under the Turnbull Government in December 2017, and appointed David Coleman as Immigration Minister.

Scope
The portfolio and department were created in July 1945, during the last months of World War II.  Previously, immigration affairs were handled by the Minister for Home Affairs (1901–1932) and the Minister for the Interior (1932–1945), except that between January 1925 and January 1928 Victor Wilson and Thomas Paterson were Ministers for Markets and Migration.

The Minister for Immigration, Multicultural Affairs and Citizenship was usually one of the senior members of Cabinet, although between the Tenth Menzies Ministry and the Third Fraser Ministry, the post was downgraded to that of a junior minister. The minister and department have on several occasions been responsible for another portfolio in addition to immigration, such as ethnic/multicultural affairs, local government or border protection.

List of ministers for immigration
The following individuals have held responsibility for immigration:

Notes
 Barnard was one of a two-man ministry consisting of himself and Gough Whitlam for two weeks until the full ministry was announced.

List of ministers for customs
From 1901 to 1956 Customs was handled by the Minister for Trade and Customs.  In 1956 Frederick Osborne was appointed Minister for Customs and Excise.  Kep Enderby was appointed Minister for Police and Customs in 1975.  In 1975 responsibility for customs was absorbed into the portfolio of the Minister for Business and Consumer Affairs, John Howard.  In May 1982, the portfolio of the Minister for Business and Consumer Affairs was abolished and customs functions were transferred to the Minister for Industry and Commerce, Phillip Lynch.  In January 1988, Barry Jones became responsible for customs as Minister for Science, Customs and Small Business within John Button's portfolio of Industry and Commerce and there were subsequently junior ministers responsible for customs within the industry portfolio until March 1993 and from March 1994 until December 2007, when customs became part of the responsibility of the Minister for Home Affairs, Bob Debus. Between September 2013 and December 2017, it was the responsibility of the Minister for Immigration and Border Protection.

The following individuals have held responsibility for customs:

Notes
 Whitlam was one of a two-man ministry consisting of himself and Lance Barnard for two weeks until the full ministry was announced.

List of assistant ministers
On  the third Hawke ministry implemented a two-level ministerial structure, with distinctions drawn between senior and junior ministers. This arrangement has been continued by subsequent governments; although there has not always been a junior minister in the immigration portfolio. Senior ministers are shown above. Junior ministers are shown below. The following individuals served as the Assistant Minister for Multicultural Affairs, or any precedent titles:

References

External links
 

Immigration, Citizenship and Multicultural Affairs
Immigration to Australia
Australia